Go is the twelfth studio album by Christian pop rock band Newsboys, released on 31 October 2006. It is the band's last album with Phil Joel as a member, and is their first (and only full-length studio) album with Paul Colman.

An EP, entitled Go EP, was released on the iTunes Store as a preview of the album. It featured the songs "Wherever We Go", "Go (I Wanna Send You)", and "I Am Free" from the album. On 30 September 2008, nearly a year after its release, it spawned its own live CD/DVD, Houston We Are GO.

The album produced one music video for the single, "Something Beautiful".

Singles
A live version of "I Am Free" (cover of Desperation Band song) was released as a single to radio stations long before the release of the album (early 2006), and peaked at No. 11 on Billboard's Hot Christian Songs chart, as well as No. 11 on the Hot Christian Adult Contemporary charts.

The second single, "Wherever We Go", was released to radio stations on 18 August 2006, and has peaked at No. 3 on the Hot Christian Songs chart and No. 15 on the Hot Christian Adult Contemporary charts.

"Something Beautiful" was released as the third promotional single for GO in early 2007, and peaked at No. 4 on Billboard'''s Hot Christian Songs chart, and at No. 6 on the Hot Christian Adult Contemporary charts. The song also finished at No. 5 on the 2007 year-end chart for Hot Christian Songs.

"In Wonder" was released between late summer and early fall of 2007 as the fourth single to radio to promote the album. It peaked at No. 6 on Billboard's Hot Christian Songs chart, and No. 5 on the Hot Christian Adult Contemporary charts. It is a new version of a song written in 2004 by New Zealand band Magnify. Rick Knott, lead singer of Magnify, is noted as one of the authors of the track on the Newsboys album. The lyrics on the new song are different from the original song, however, the backing track is nearly identical.

Critical reception

Reviews were generally positive, especially in the Christian market, where the band was praised for getting back to its original rock roots.  Jesus Freak Hideout gave the album 4.5 out of 5 stars and raved “Catchy, fun, worshipful, encouraging, and memorable, GO is liable to cause longtime fans to join me in saying, ‘Hallelujah, the Newsboys are back!’” CCM Magazine had similar praise to offer, remarking in their review that the band has "returned in what’s arguably its best creative offering since 1998’s Step Up to the Microphone. The group achieves the rare distinction of having a cross generational impact, maintaining its old school die-hards, while giving the younger crew something substantial to sink their teeth into."

"Go" was New Release Tuesdays "Album of the Year" in 2006.

Commercial performance
Selling 23,246 units in its first week (their best sales week since Adorations release in 2003), Go debuted at No. 51 on the Billboard 200 charts, and at No. 4 on the Top Christian Albums chart. Go fell to No. 6 in its second week on the Christian chart and No. 9 in its third, but rose to No. 8 in its fourth week.

After two months of release, "Go" had sold over 100,000 copies at an average of 15,000 per week.

Track listing

 Personnel Newsboys Peter Furler – lead vocals, guitars, drums 
 Paul Colman – vocals, lead guitars
 Jeff Frankenstein – keyboards, programming
 Phil Joel – vocals, bass guitar
 Duncan Phillips – drums, percussionGuest performers Lynn Nichols – guitar (1)
 Evie Tornquist – vocals (11)Production'''
 Peter Furler – producer, additional recording
 Tedd T. – producer, recording at Antenna Studios, Nashville, Tennessee
 Dale Bray – executive producer 
 Wes Campbell – executive producer 
 Dave Wagner – executive producer 
 F. Reid Shippen – mixing at Sound Stage Studios, Nashville, Tennessee (1, 2, 3, 5–11)
 Stephen Lotz – mix assistant (1, 2, 3, 5–11)
 Tom Lord-Alge – mixing at South Beach Studios, Miami Beach, Florida (4)
 Femio Hernandez – mix assistant (4)
 Bob Ludwig – mastering at Gateway Mastering, Portland, Maine
 Stephen Dix – art direction, design 
 Craig A. Mason – additional design 
 David Dobson – photography 
 Rebecca Colman – additional photography

References

Newsboys albums
2006 albums
Inpop Records albums